"Pieces" is the seventeenth single by L'Arc-en-Ciel, released on June 2, 1999 it debuted at number 1 on the Oricon chart. "Pieces" was awarded "Best Video of the Year" at "Space Shower Music Video Awards 99". It sold 483890 copies in its first week.

The b-side "Fate (Fake Fate Mix)" is Yukihiro's remix version of "Fate" from their 1998 album Heart.

Track listing

* Remix by Yukihiro.

References

1999 singles
L'Arc-en-Ciel songs
Oricon Weekly number-one singles
Songs written by Hyde (musician)
Songs written by Tetsuya (musician)
Ki/oon Music singles
1999 songs